The Winchendon Music Festival (WMF) is a non-profit organization and concert series held in Winchendon, Massachusetts. The Festival showcases performances by international artists from a variety of genres including (but not limited to) classical, folk, jazz, historical performance, and world music. Concerts are free to the public, with support from several local Cultural Councils, the Massachusetts Cultural Council, the Robinson Broadhurst Foundation, the Winchendon History & Cultural Center, and the First Congregational Church of Winchendon.

Background
Founded in 2016 by multi-instrumentalist, scholar, and composer Andrew Arceci, the Winchendon Music Festival is dedicated to the memory of his  father, Robert J. Arceci (1950-2015), a pediatric oncologist with a passion for the arts.

The Festival's founder, Andrew Arceci, serves as Festival Director and frequent benefactor. He often leads and directs several of the Festival's musical programs each year. He is the director of the Collegium Musicum at Wellesley College, a Fellow at Harvard University, and performs internationally on viol, violone, and bass.

The Festival presents solo, small ensemble, and chamber orchestral programs at several venues, including Old Centre Church in the Old Centre Historic District, and the salon room at the Winchendon History & Cultural Center.

Past Seasons

2016 Festival
 Andrew Arceci, Teresa Wakim, & WMF artists
 Floyds Row
 John Arcaro & Band

2017 Festival
 Andrew Arceci, Teresa Wakim, & WMF artists
 Andrew Arceci & WMF artists
 John Arcaro & Band
 Andrew Arceci & WMF artists
 Andrew Arceci & WMF artists

2018 Festival
 Andrew Arceci & WMF artists
 Anne Azéma
 John Arcaro & Band
 Muscari
 Floyds Row
 John Arcaro & Band

2019 Festival
 Andrew Arceci & WMF artists
 John Arcaro & Band
 Beth Bahia Cohen
 Chris Moyse
 Jennifer Ashe & Christina Wright-Ivanova
 Randall Scotting, Andrew Arceci, & WMF artists
 Mehmet Ali Sanlıkol Trio

2020 Festival, cancelled due to the COVID-19 pandemic

 Cristiana Pegoraro, piano
 Burcu Gulec Quartet
 Bob Winter - With Strings Attached
 Worcester Jazz Orchestra
 Franziska Huhn, harp
 Naomi Yamaguchi, piano
 William Simms, theorbo
 Teresa Wakim (soprano), Asako Takeuchi (baroque violin), & WMF artists
 Jaap ter Linden, baroque cello
 Andrew Arceci & WMF artists
 Bill Staines, singer-songwriter
 John Arcaro & Band

2021 Festival, cancelled due to the COVID-19 pandemic

References 

Music festivals in Massachusetts
Performing arts in Massachusetts